Faisel Al-Khodaim (Arabic:فيصل الخديم) (born 18 August 1988) is an Emirati footballer. He currently plays for Al Arabi as a midfielder.

External links

References

Emirati footballers
1988 births
Living people
Al-Wasl F.C. players
Dibba FC players
Emirates Club players
Baniyas Club players
Al-Taawon (UAE) Club players
Al-Arabi SC (UAE) players
UAE First Division League players
UAE Pro League players
Association football midfielders